Alexandr Rudolfovich Elke (Александр Рудольфович Эльке, born 18 January 1971) is a Kazakhstani water polo player. He was a member of the Kazakhstan men's national water polo team, playing as a centre back. He was a part of the team at the 2000 Summer Olympics and 2004 Summer Olympics. On club level he played for Real Canoe NC in Spain.

References

1971 births
Living people
Sportspeople from Almaty
Kazakhstani male water polo players
Water polo players at the 2000 Summer Olympics
Water polo players at the 2004 Summer Olympics
Olympic water polo players of Kazakhstan
Asian Games medalists in water polo
Water polo players at the 1994 Asian Games
Water polo players at the 1998 Asian Games
Asian Games gold medalists for Kazakhstan
Medalists at the 1994 Asian Games
Medalists at the 1998 Asian Games
Expatriate water polo players
Kazakhstani expatriate sportspeople in Spain
20th-century Kazakhstani people